Albert Aarons (March 23, 1932 – November 17, 2015) was an American jazz trumpeter.

Biography
Aarons was born in Pittsburgh, Pennsylvania, and graduated from Wayne State University in Detroit. He began to gain attention as a trumpet player in 1956, and started working with jazz artist Yusef Lateef and pianist Barry Harris in the latter part of that decade in Detroit. After a period playing with jazz organist Wild Bill Davis, he played trumpet in the Count Basie Orchestra from 1961 to 1969.

In the 1970s, Aarons worked as a sideman for singers Sarah Vaughan and Ella Fitzgerald, and saxophonist Gene Ammons. He was also a contributor to jazz fusion, playing on School Days with Stanley Clarke, and appears with Snooky Young on the classic 1976 album Bobby Bland and B. B. King Together Again...Live.

Discography

As leader
Al Aarons & the L.A. Jazz Caravan (LOSA, 1996?)

As sideman
With Gene Ammons
Free Again (Prestige, 1971)
With Count Basie
The Legend (Roulette, 1961)
Back with Basie (Roulette, 1962)
Basie in Sweden (Roulette, 1962)
On My Way & Shoutin' Again! (Verve, 1962)
This Time by Basie! (Reprise, 1963)
More Hits of the 50's and 60's (Verve, 1963)
Pop Goes the Basie (Reprise, 1965)
Basie Meets Bond (United Artists, 1966)
Live at the Sands (Before Frank) (Reprise, 1966 [1998])
Sinatra at the Sands (Reprise, 1966) with Frank Sinatra
Basie's Beatle Bag (Verve, 1966)
Broadway Basie's...Way (Command, 1966)
Hollywood...Basie's Way (Command, 1967)
Basie's Beat (Verve, 1967)
Basie's in the Bag (Brunswick, 1967)
The Happiest Millionaire (Coliseum, 1967)
Half a Sixpence (Dot, 1967)
The Board of Directors (Dot, 1967) with The Mills Brothers
Manufacturers of Soul (Brunswick, 1968) with Jackie Wilson
The Board of Directors Annual Report (Dot, 1968) with The Mills Brothers
Basie Straight Ahead (Dot, 1968)
How About This (Paramount, 1968) with Kay Starr
Standing Ovation (Dot, 1969)
With Brass Fever
Time Is Running Out (Impulse!, 1976) 
With Kenny Burrell
Both Feet on the Ground (Fantasy, 1973)
With Frank Capp
Live at the Century Plaza (Concord, 1972)
With Buddy Collette
Blockbuster (RGB, 1973)
Jazz for Thousand Oaks (UFO-Bass, 1996)
With Ella Fitzgerald
Ella and Basie! (Verve, 1963)
With Benny Golson
Killer Joe (Columbia, 1977)
With Eddie Harris
How Can You Live Like That? (Atlantic, 1976)
With Gene Harris
Nexus (1975)
With Milt Jackson
Memphis Jackson (Impulse!, 1969)
With Carmen McRae
Can't Hide Love (Blue Note, 1976)
With Zoot Sims with the Benny Carter Orchestra
Passion Flower: Zoot Sims Plays Duke Ellington (1979) - Al Aarons, Oscar Brashear, Bobby Bryant, Earl Gardner, J.J. Johnson, Grover Mitchell, Benny Powell, Britt Woodman, Marshal Royal, Frank Wess, Buddy Collette, Plas Johnson, Jimmy Rowles, John Collins, Andy Simpkins, Grady Tate, Benny Carter (arr, cond) Hollywood, CA, August 14, 1979
With Frank Wess
Southern Comfort (Prestige, 1962)
With Gerald Wilson
Calafia (Trend, 1985)

References

External links 
[ All Music]

1932 births
2015 deaths
Bebop trumpeters
Musicians from Pittsburgh
Wayne State University alumni
American jazz trumpeters
American male trumpeters
Jazz musicians from Pennsylvania
American male jazz musicians